Porcellio is a genus of woodlice in the family Porcellionidae. These crustaceans are found essentially worldwide. A well-known species is the common rough woodlouse, Porcellio scaber.

Most of the hundreds of Porcellio species were described by 1950, and many were known by the end of the 19th century already. But occasionally, new species have been found even in recent times.

Species
There are approximately 191 species in the genus Porcellio :

Porcellio cyclocephalus and P. notatus are fossil species from Baltic amber. They are placed in the present genus for lack of a better alternative, but whether this is correct is doubtful as the original descriptions are very brief and hardly diagnostic.

References

Porcellionidae
Isopod genera
Taxa named by Pierre André Latreille